The First Perrottet ministry or First Perrottet–Toole ministry was the 98th ministry of the Government of New South Wales, and was led by Dominic Perrottet, the state's 46th Premier.

The Liberal–National coalition ministry was formed following the resignation of the previous Premier, Gladys Berejiklian and the election of Perrottet as leader of the Liberal Party on 5 October 2021. Stuart Ayres was elected as deputy party leader. Separate to the Liberal Party leadership election, the National Party also had its own leadership election on 6 October 2021, following the resignation of John Barilaro as party leader, who said it was "the right time for me to hand the reins over". Paul Toole was elected as National Party leader and subsequently replaced Barilaro as Deputy Premier of New South Wales.

The ministry was largely unchanged from the previous Berejiklian ministry as Perrottet opted not to reshuffle the cabinet yet. The ministry continued until the major cabinet reshuffle on 21 December 2021 when the Second Perrottet ministry was sworn in. The Parliament of New South Wales considers the second ministry to be a separate and new ministry from the first.

Composition of ministry
Upon his election as Liberal Party leader, Perrottet announced there would not be a reshuffle until later in the year, with the focus being on bringing New South Wales out of COVID-19 lockdown. This meant that all ministers would retain their portfolios from the previous Berejiklian ministry except for where there were resignations and/or role changes as a result of the new leadership.

Perrottet, Ayres, Kean and Brad Hazzard were the first ministers to be sworn in by the Governor Margaret Beazley on 5 October 2021. Toole and the other ministers were sworn in on 6 October 2021.

In the order of seniority:

 
Ministers are members of the Legislative Assembly unless otherwise noted.

See also

Members of the New South Wales Legislative Assembly, 2019–2023
Members of the New South Wales Legislative Council, 2019–2023

Notes

References 

 

New South Wales ministries
2021 establishments in Australia
Lists of current office-holders in Australia
Ministries established in 2021